Pythium acanthicum is a plant pathogen infecting strawberries.

References

External links
 Index Fungorum
 USDA ARS Fungal Database

Water mould strawberry diseases
acanthicum
Species described in 1930